"Uno" (stylized in all caps; Spanish for "one") is a Spanglish language song recorded by Russian rave group Little Big. It was due to represent Russia in the Eurovision Song Contest 2020 before its cancellation. The song was released as a digital download and for streaming on 13 March 2020.

With over 260 million views, it is, as of January 2023, the most viewed video on the Eurovision Song Contest's YouTube channel ever. The song was also added to Just Dance 2021. The video was also full of in-joke cultural references to the history of TV-performances of the famous ballet dancer Maya Plisetskaya.

Eurovision Song Contest

The song was Russia's entry in the Eurovision Song Contest 2020 after Little Big had been internally selected by the Russian broadcaster, Channel One. The song would have performed in one of the two semi-final rounds. On 28 January 2020, a special allocation draw was held which placed each country into one of the two semi-finals. Russia was placed in the first semi-final, which was to be held on 12 May 2020, and was scheduled to perform in the first half of the show. However, Eurovision Song Contest 2020 was cancelled due to the COVID-19 pandemic.

Charts

Release history

References

2020 singles
2020 songs
Eurovision songs of 2020
Eurovision songs of Russia
Number-one singles in Russia
Little Big (band) songs